Brainerd Public Schools (BPS), also known as ISD 181, is a school district headquartered in Brainerd, Minnesota.

In addition to Brainerd it serves Baxter, Fort Ripley, Garrison, Merrifield, and most of Nisswa.

History
Jerry Walseth became the superintendent circa 2000.

The Minnesota Association of School Administrators gave Walseth the Administrator of Excellence Award.

In 2008 a referendum for school funding failed, and as a result the district closed two schools.

Laine Larson became the superintendent in 2016. In 2021 the Minnesota Association of School Administrators gave her the Kay E. Jacobs Memorial Award.

Schools
 High school
 Brainerd High School

 Middle school
 Forestview Middle School

 Elementary school
 Baxter Elementary School
 Garfield Elementary School
 Harrison Elementary School
 Lowell Elementary School
 Nisswa Elementary School
 Riverside Elementary School

 Other
 Brainerd Community Education
 Brainerd Learning Center
 Lincoln Education Center

Former schools
 Whittier Elementary School - In 2008 its enrollment was below 140 and it was scheduled to close that year.

References

Further reading

External links
 Brainerd Public Schools

School districts in Minnesota
Education in Crow Wing County, Minnesota